Adjutants of Love (Adyutanti lyubvi) is a 2005 Russian telenovela. It is the second successful historical telenovela from Amedia Productions, after Poor Nastya (2003).

Plot 
Pyotr Cherkasov and Olga Lopuhina grew up together in the country. They fall in love and decide to get married. But Pyotr's mother doesn't want the two of them together, so she finds "a good opportunity for Olga": Count Roman Mongo-Stolipin, a rich politician from Saint Petersburg. Olga decides to marry the Count.

Pyotr is hurt. He goes to Saint Petersburg to become an adjutant of Tsar Paul. Paul is murdered and is succeeded by his young son Alexander. Pyotr becomes a very good friend of Alexander, who sends him to Paris to spy on Napoleon Bonaparte. Though still in love with Olga, Pyotr becomes part of the politician drama in Europe.

Cast

Main roles
 Nikita Panfilov as Pyotr Cherkasov
 Karina Razumovskaya as Olga Mongo-Stolipina
 Andrey Ilin   as Roman Mongo-Stolipin
 Pavel Barshak as Mikhael Lugin
 Aleksandr Ustyugov as Platon Tolstoi
Natalia Ivanova-Fenkina /  Maria Kozlova as Varvara Lanskaya

Supporting roles
 Aleksandr Arsentyev as D'Arni
 Aleksandr Efimov as Alexander I of Russia
 Kristina Kuzmina as Empress Elizabeth
 Aleksei Zavyalov as Adam Czartoryski
 Vitaliy Kovalenko as Napoleon I of France
 Irina Nizina as Josephine de Beauharnais
 Ilya Blednyy as Louis Antoine, Duke of Enghien
 Yulia Zhigalina as Ksenya Von Zak
 Aleksandr Abdulov as  Horatio Nelson
 Armen Dzhigarkhanyan as Head of the Order of the Illuminati
 Valeri Zolotukhin as Alexander Suvorov
 Marina Zudina as Aglaia Lanskaya
 Alla Kazanskaya as Anna Lopuchina, grandmother Olga Lopukhina
 Avangard Leontiev as  Paul I of Russia
 Elena Podkaminskaya as Pauline Bonaparte
 Andrey Smolyakov as Charles Maurice de Talleyrand-Périgord
 Alexander Smirnov  as William Pitt the Younger
 Galina Polskikh as Madlen
 Aleksandr Filippenko as Boris Kuragin, godfather Pyotr Cherkasov
 Igor Yasulovich as Peter Ludwig von der Pahlen
 Yevgeny Kindinov as Rene, a monk templar
 Yulia Mayboroda as  Hortense de Beauharnais

External links 
Adyutanty lyubvi on IMDb
Amedia Productions website

2005 Russian television series debuts
2006 Russian television series endings
2000s Russian television series
Russian telenovelas
2005 telenovelas
Russian television miniseries
Channel One Russia original programming